A minefield is an area covered with land mines or naval mines.

Minefield may also refer to:

 "Minefields" (Faouzia and John Legend song), 2020
 "Minefield" (Star Trek: Enterprise), the 29th episode of the television series Star Trek: Enterprise
 Minefield (trunk build), the branding used for trunk builds of Mozilla Firefox

See also
 Mindfield (disambiguation)